The Elizabethtown and Paducah Railroad was a 19th-century railway company in western Kentucky in the United States. It operated from 1867 to 1874, when it was purchased by the Louisville, Paducah and Southwestern Railroad. It later made up part of the Illinois Central network and its former rights-of-way currently form parts of the class-II Paducah and Louisville Railway.

It connected with the Owensboro and Russellville (and subsequently with the L&N network) at Central City in Muhlenberg County.

See also
 List of Kentucky railroads

Defunct Kentucky railroads
Defunct companies based in Kentucky